Brian Myers is an American professional wrestler.

Brian Myers may also refer to:

 Brian Reynolds Myers, American academic

See also
Bryant Myers, Puerto Rican musician
Brian Meyer (disambiguation)